The 1984 Michigan Wolverines football team was an American football team that represented the University of Michigan in the 1984 Big Ten Conference football season. In their 16th season under head coach Bo Schembechler, the Wolverines compiled a 6–6 record (5–4 against conference opponents) and outscored opponents by a total of 214 to 200. It was the only team in Michigan's 21 seasons under coach Schembechler that did not finish its season with a winning record.

Michigan began the season under quarterback Jim Harbaugh. The Wolverines went 3–1 in their first four games under Harbaugh, but Harbaugh's season ended with a broken arm in a loss to Michigan State. Michigan next turned to Russ Rein who started two games, including a 26–0 loss to Iowa, the worst loss for a Michigan team since Schembechler took over as head coach. Chris Zurbrugg took over as quarterback for the remaining five games in which the Wolverines won two and lost three.  In the 1984 Holiday Bowl, Michigan lost to national champion BYU. BYU quarterback Robbie Bosco led a fourth-quarter comeback with two touchdown passes, including the game winner with 83 seconds remaining in the game.

Linebacker Mike Mallory was selected as the most valuable player on the Michigan team. The team's statistical leaders included quarterback Jim Harbaugh with 718 passing yards, tailback Jamie Morris with 573 rushing yards, tight end Sim Nelson with 459 receiving yards, and placekicker Bob Bergeron with 60 points scored.

Schedule

Season summary

Preseason
The 1983 Michigan Wolverines football team had compiled a 9–3, lost to Auburn in the Sugar Bowl, and was ranked No. 8 in the final AP poll. Several key players from the 1983 team did not return in 1984, including Steve Smith, a three-year starter at quarterback, and All-American offensive linemen Stefan Humphries and Tom Dixon.

In preseason competition, Jim Harbaugh won the starting quarterback position over Bo Rein and Chris Zurbrugg. Offensive guard Doug James and linebacker Mike Mallory were selected as the team co-captains.

Miami (FL)

On September 8, 1984, Michigan defeated Jimmy Johnson's Miami Hurricanes, the defending national champions who were ranked No. 1 by both the AP and UPI in preseason polls. The Wolverines prevailed by a 22–14 score before a crowd of 105,403 at Michigan Stadium. The victory broke Miami's 13-game winning streak.

Michigan's first scoring drive began when Rodney Lyles forced a Don Oliver fumble and Michigan recovered at its 45-yard line. Quarterback Jim Harbaugh, making his first start for Michigan, led the Wolverines 55 yards down the field with Bob Perryman scoring on six-yard run. Bob Bergeron missed the extra point. Michigan's defense dominated in the first half, holding Miami scoreless, and the Wolverines led 6–0 at halftime.

In the third quarter, Miami quarterback Bernie Kosar threw a 32-yard touchdown pass to Eddie Brown, and Miami took a 7–6 lead. Michigan responded with two drives capped by Perryman touchdowns and led 19–7 with seven minutes remaining in the game.  Kosar then connected with Stanley Shakespeare for a 44-yard touchdown pass to cut the lead to five points. On Miami's next possession, Rodney Lyles intercepted a Kosar pass deep in Miami territory, and Bob Bergeron kicked a 27-yard field goal to extend Michigan's lead to eight points. When Miami regained possession for its final drive, Lyles made his third interception of the game.

Michigan intercepted a total of six passes off Kosar (three by Lyles, one each by Doug Mallory, Brad Cochran, and Mike Hammerstein), sacked Kosar five times, and forced two fumbles. Kosar completed 16 of 38 passes for 228 yards. Harbaugh completed 11 of 21 passes for 163 yards. Tailback Gerald White rushed for 89 yards  on 27 carries, while Perryman scored three touchdowns and ran for 79 yards. Miami's Alonzo Highsmith was the leading ground-gainer with 126 yards.

Washington

On September 15, 1984, Michigan lost to Washington, 20–11, before a crowd of 103,072 at Michigan Stadium in Ann Arbor. In his second start for Michigan, Jim Harbaugh completed 17 of 37 passes for 183 yards and three interceptions. Michigan turned the ball over twice on fumbles.

Wisconsin

On September 22, 1984, Michigan beat Wisconsin, 20–14, before a crowd of 104,239 at Michigan Stadium. Wisconsin out-gained the Wolverines, 162 yards to nine, in the first quarter, but was unable to score.  Michigan led 10–0 at halftime. Six Wisconsin turnovers (five fumbles and an interception) helped Michigan. Wisconsin came back in the second half. A blocked Michigan punt at the Wolverines 14-yard line resulted in the Badgers' final touchdown. Jim Harbaugh completed 11 of 21 passes for 137 yards and a touchdown. Jamie Morris rushed for 138 yards on 28 carries. Wisconsin back Larry Emery rushed for 185 yards on 17 carries. Bob Bergeron kicked two field goals, including a 50-yarder in the fourth quarter.

Indiana

On September 29, 1984, Michigan defeated Indiana, 14–6, before a crowd of 38,729 at Memorial Stadium in Bloomington, Indiana. Jamie Morris gained 86 yards on 19 carries. Jim Harbaugh completed 14 of 18 passes for 135 yards.

Michigan State

On October 6, 1974, Michigan lost to Michigan State, 19–7, before a crowd of 105,612 at Michigan Stadium in Ann Arbor. Bobby Morse returned a punt 87 yards for a touchdown to give the Spartans a 13–0 lead in the second quarter. Michigan quarterback Jim Harbaugh then led the Wolverines down the field on a drive capped by a one-yard Eddie Garret touchdown run. In the third quarter, Harbaugh collided with Spartan linebacker Thomas Tyree as they went after a loose ball. Harbaugh's arm was broken, and he was carried off the field on a stretcher. Harbaugh had completed seven of 14 passes for 101 yards to that point. Russ Rein and Chris Zurbrugg, playing in place of Harbaugh, were unable to move the team effectively and combined for three interceptions.

Northwestern

On October 13, 1984, Michigan defeated Northwestern, 31–0, before a homecoming crowd of 102,245 at Michigan Stadium. The game was played at the same time that Game 5 of the 1984 World Series was being played an hour down the freeway in Detroit, leaving many fans to listen to the baseball game on pocket radios while attending the football game. Alan Trammell hit two home runs for the Tigers, and Rick Rogers gained 139 yards for the Wolverines on 27 carries. Russell Rein started at quarterback for Michigan after Jim Harbaugh broke his arm one week earlier against Michigan State. Rein completed eight of 11 passes for 81 yards, including a five-yard touchdown pass to Eric Kattus. On the opening kickoff of the second half, Jamie Morris returned the kick 80 yards to Northwestern's 20-yard line.

Iowa

    
    
    
    
    

On October 21, 1984, Michigan lost to Iowa, 26-0, before a crowd of 66,025 at Kinnick Stadium in Iowa City. It was the worst loss suffered by Michigan since Bo Schembechler became the head coach in 1969. For Iowa, Owen Gill rushed for 85 yards and Ronnie Harmon for 63, and Chuck Long completed 14 of 20 passes for 146 yards. Michigan was held to 187 yard of total offense, led by 55 rushing yards from Rick Rogers. Russell Rein started at quarterback, completing seven of 13 passes for only 40 yards and two interceptions. He was replaced by Chris Zurbrugg who completed only four of 12 passes for 43 yards win one interception.

Illinois

On October 27, 1984, Michigan defeated a favored Illinois team by a 26-18 score before a crowd of 104,916 at Michigan Stadium.

Chris Zurbrugg, in his first start as Michigan's quarterback, led an option offense in which he rushed for 76 yards and passed for 51. Rick Rogers added 95 rushing yards. Rodney Lyles set up Michigan's first touchdown with an interception on a tip from Kevin Brooks that Lyles returned to Illinois' 13-yard line. Brad Cochran and Mike Mallory also had interceptions, and Mike Hammerstein recovered an Illinois fumble that was caused by a hit from Jim Scarcelli.

Illinois out-gained the Wolverines, 419 yards to 280. Quarterback Jack Trudeau completed 26 of 41 passes for 269 yards, three interceptions and a touchdown. David Williams caught 12 passes for 132 yards, pushing him over 1,000 yards for the season. Fullback Thomas Rooks rushed for 110 yards on 26 carries.

Purdue

On November 3, 1984, Michigan lost to Purdue, 31–29, before a crowd of 60,159 at Ross–Ade Stadium in West Lafayette, Indiana.

Behind the passing of Jim Everett, Purdue dominated the game early, leading 24-0 at halftime and 31-7 with seven minutes remaining. Everett completed 23 of 32 passes for 290 yards and two touchdowns. Michigan was held to 12 rushing yards and three first downs in the first half.  After the game, coach Bo Schembechler described the first half as "our poorest half ever at Michigan."

In the second half, Michigan's defense took hold and the Wolverines outscored the Boilermakers, 29-7. Chris Zurbrugg threw four touchdown passes, including three in the final four minutes and seven seconds. Zurbrugg finished the game completing 21 of 30 passes for 259 yards and four touchdowns.

Minnesota

    
    
    
    
    
    

On November 10, 1984, Michigan defeated Lou Holtz's Minnesota Golden Gophers, 31–7, before a crowd of 101,247 at Michigan Stadium in Ann Arbor. Jamie Morris led the Wolverines with 125 rushing yards on 14 carries, including a 68-yard run. Chris Zurbrugg also completed seven of ten passes. The highlight of the game was a trick play in which Zurbrugg handed off to Gerald White who then handed the ball to Vince Bean on a reverse, with Bean then passing to Paul Jokisch for a 67-yard touchdown. In the third quarter, Michigan stopped Minnesota on three straight plays from the one-yard line, then drove 99 yards, culminating with an 11-yard touchdown run by Morris. Minnesota quarterback Rickey Foggie led Minnesota with 106 rushing yards and 94 passing yards.

Ohio State

    
    
    
    
    

On November 17, 1984, Michigan lost to Ohio State, 21–6, before a crowd of 90,286 at Ohio Stadium in Columbus, Ohio.  Keith Byars scored three touchdowns including two in the final six-and-a-half minutes.

1984 Holiday Bowl

    
    
    
    
    
    
    

On December 21, 1984, Michigan lost to No. 1 BYU by a 24–17 score before a crowd of 61,243 in the 1984 Holiday Bowl played at Jack Murphy Stadium in San Diego. With the victory, BYU secured the national championship with a No. 1 ranking in the AP and UPI polls.

Michigan forced six turnovers and led, 17–10, early in the fourth quarter.  BYU quarterback Robbie Bosco sustained a knee injury in the first quarter on a play resulting in a roughing the passer penalty against Michigan. Bosco was carried off the field with his leg dangling, but returned in the second quarter with his knee heavily taped. Hobbling noticeably, Bosco led a fourth-quarter comeback, throwing touchdown passes of seven yards to Glen Kozlowski and 13 yards to Kelly Smith. He threw the game-winning touchdown pass to Kelly Smith with 83 seconds remaining in the game.

Bosco completed 30 of 42 passes for 343 yards. BYU back Lakei Heimuli rushed for 82 yards on 16 carries.  For Michigan, Bob Perryman rushed for 110 yards on 13 carries, and Chris Zurbrugg completed seven of 15 passes for 82 yards.

Awards and honors
For the first time since Bo Schembechler took over as Michigan's head coach, no Michigan players were named to the 1984 All-America team. However, seven were recognized by the Associated Press (AP) and/or United Press International (UPI) on the 1984 All-Big Ten Conference football team: linebacker Mike Mallory (AP-1, UPI-1); defensive tackle Kevin Brooks (UPI-1);  offensive guard Doug James (AP-2, UPI-2); middle guard Al Sincich (AP-2, UPI-2); tight end Sim Nelson (AP-2); linebacker Rod Lyles (UPI-2); and defensive back Brad Cochran.

Team awards were presented as follows:
Most Valuable Player: Mike Mallory
Meyer Morton Award: Jim Harbaugh
John Maulbetsch Award: Garland Rivers
Frederick Matthei Award: Tony Gant
Arthur Robinson Scholarship Award: Mike Hammerstein
Dick Katcher Award: Clay Miller
Robert P. Ufer Award: Al Sincich

Personnel

Offense
Greg Armstrong, fullback, senior, Ohio
Art Balourdos, center, senior, Chicago, Illinois – started all 12 games at center
Vince Bean, split end, senior, Southfield, Michigan – started all 12 games at split end
Jumbo Elliott, offensive tackle, sophomore, Lake Ronkonkoma, New York – started 10 games at left offensive tackle
Rick Frazer, offensive line, junior, Escanaba, Michigan
Eddie Garrett, fullback, junior, Milwaukee – started 6 games at fullback
John Ghindia, offensive guard, senior, Trenton, Michigan
Mark Hammerstein, offensive tackle, junior, Wapakoneta, Ohio – started 2 games at left offensive guard, 2 games at left offensive tackle
Jim Harbaugh, quarterback, junior, Palo Alto, California – started 5 games at quarterback
Dave Herrick, offensive tackle – defensive tackle, freshman, Indianapolis, Indiana
Doug James, offensive guard, senior, Louisville, Kentucky – started 9 games at left offensive guard
Gilvanni Johnson, wide receiver, junior, Detroit, Michigan – started 2 games at flanker
Steve Johnson, wide receiver, junior, Youngstown, Ohio – started 4 games at flanker
Paul Jokish, wide receiver, junior, Clarkston, Michigan – started 1 game at flanker
Eric Kattus, tight end, senior, Cincinnati
Ben Logue, running back, junior, Atlanta
Triando Markray side receiver, junior, Detroit – started 5 games at flanker
Clay Miller, offensive tackle, senior, Norman, Oklahoma – started all 12 games at right offensive tackle
Jamie Morris, tailback, freshman, Ayer, Massachusetts – started 4 games at tailback
Sim Nelson, tight end, senior, Fort Wayne, Indiana – started all 12 games at tight end
Bob Perryman, fullback, junior, Buzzards Bay, Massachusetts – started 6 games at fullback
Bob Popowski, offensive guard, senior, Chicago – started 1 games at left offensive guard
Jerry Quaerna, offensive tackle, junior, Janesville, Wisconsin
Russell Rein, quarterback, sophomore, Oak Lawn, Illinois – started 2 games at quarterback
Rick Rogers, running back, senior, Inkster, Michigan – started 6 games at tailback
James Scarcelli, outside linebacker, senior, Warren, Michigan
Paul Schmerge, tight end, junior, Cincinnati, Ohio
Tim Schulte, outside linebacker, sophomore, Villa Hills, Kentucky
Mike Sessa, wide receiver, senior, St. Joseph, Michigan
Dave Simon, center, senior, Grosse Pointe, Michigan
Bob Tabachino, offensive guard, senior, Youngstown, Ohio – started all 12 games at right offensive guard
John Vitale, offensive guard, freshman, Detroit
Gerald White, running back, sophomore, Titusville, Florida – started 2 games at tailback
Chris Zurbrugg, quarterback, sophomore, Alliance, Ohio – started 5 games at quarterback

Defense
Jeffery Akers, inside linebacker, Lynn, Massachusetts
Tim Anderson, inside linebacker, senior, Ann Arbor, Michigan – started all 12 games at inside linebacker
Allen Bishop, defensive back, sophomore, Miami, Florida
Kevin Brooks, defensive tackle, senior, Detroit, Michigan – started 11 games at defensive tackle
Erik Campbell, wide receiver, freshman, Gary, Indiana – started 5 games at free safety
Brad Cochran, defensive back, junior, Royal Oak, Michigan
Keith E. Cowan, outside linebacker, junior, Pittsburgh, Pennsylvania
Vincent DeFelice, defensive tackle, senior, Trenton, Michigan
Tony Gant, defensive back, junior, Fremont, Ohio – started 3 games at free safety
Joe Gray, middle guard, senior, Detroit, Michigan – started 2 games at middle guard
Mike Hammerstein, defensive tackle, senior, Wapakoneta, Ohio – started all 12 games at defensive tackle
Billy Harris, middle guard, sophomore, Xenia, Ohio
Dieter Heren, defensive back, junior, Fort Wayne, Indiana – started 1 games at strong safety
Ivan Hicks, defensive back, junior, Pennsauken, New Jersey – started 4 games at strong safety, 1 game at free safety
Phil Lewandowski, inside linebacker, senior, Solon, Ohio
Rodney Lyles, outside linebacker, senior, Miami – started all 12 games at outside linebacker
Doug Mallory, defensive back, sophomore, DeKalb, Illinois – started 7 games at strong safety, 3 games at free safety
Mike Mallory, inside linebacker, senior, DeKalb, Illinois – started all 12 games at inside linebacker
Andree McIntyre, inside linebacker, sophomore, Chicago
Dave Meredith, defensive tackle, senior, Sterling Heights, Michigan – started 1 games at defensive tackle
Mark Messner, defensive line, freshman, Milford, Michigan
Andy Moeller, inside linebacker, junior, Ann Arbor, Michigan
Greg Randall, defensive back, junior, Chagrin Falls, Ohio
Mike Reinhold, inside linebacker, junior, Muskegon, Michigan
Garland Rivers, defensive back, sophomore, Canton, Ohio – started all 12 games at strong side cornerback
Nathaniel "Nate" Rodgers, middle guard, senior, Warren, Ohio – started 2 games at middle guard
James Scarcelli – started 12 games at outside linebacker
Alan Sincich, middle guard, senior, Cleveland, Ohio – started 8 games at middle guard
Steven Thibert, outside linebacker, sophomore, Union Lake, Michigan

Kicking
Bob Bergeron, place-kicker, senior, Fort Wayne, Indiana
Mike McInyk, place-kicker, senior, Warren, Michigan
Monte Robbins, punter, sophomore, Great Bend, Kansas 
Todd Schlopy place-kicker, senior, Orchard Park, New York

Coaching staff
Head coach: Bo Schembechler
Assistant coaches: Alex Agase, Tirrel Burton, Lloyd Carr, Jerry Hanlon, Jerry Meter, Gary Moeller, Paul Schudel, Bob Thornbladh, Elliot Uzelac, Milan Vooletich
Trainer: Russ Miller
Managers: Paul Ghekas, Michael Drews, Gregory Moriartey, Kenneth Perkins

Statistical leaders

Rushing

Passing

Receiving

Scoring

References

External links
  1984 Football Team -- Bentley Historical Library, University of Michigan Athletics History

Michigan
Michigan Wolverines football seasons
Michigan Wolverines football